Grace Nichols FRSL (born 1950) is a Guyanese poet who moved to Britain in 1977, before which she worked as a teacher and journalist in Guyana. Her first collection, I is a Long-Memoried Woman (1983), won the Commonwealth Poetry Prize. In December 2021, she was announced as winner of the Queen's Gold Medal for Poetry.

Early years and education 
Grace Nichols FRSL was born in Georgetown, Guyana, and lived in a small village on the country's coast until her family moved to the city when she was eight years old. She took a Diploma in Communications from the University of Guyana, and subsequently worked as a teacher (1967–70), as a journalist and in government information services, before she immigrated to the United Kingdom in 1977. Much of her poetry is characterised by Caribbean rhythms and culture, and influenced by Guyanese and Amerindian folklore.

Literary career 
Her first collection of poetry, I is a Long-Memoried Woman won the 1983 Commonwealth Poetry Prize. A film adaptation subsequently won a gold medal at the International Film and Television Festival of New York, and the book was dramatised for BBC radio. Her novel for adults, Whole of a Morning Sky, was published in 1986. In 1992, her work featured in the anthology Daughters of Africa (edited by Margaret Busby). 

Nichols has published several further books of poetry, including in 2006  volume of new and selected poems, Startling the Flying Fish, and her books for children encompass collections of short stories and poetry anthologies. Her poetry is featured in the AQA, WJEC (Welsh Joint Education Committee), and Edexcel English/English Literature IGCSE anthologies – meaning that many GCSE students in the UK have studied her work. Her religion is Christianity after she was influenced by the UK's many religions and multi-cultural society.

Anthologise — annual poetry competition for schools 

In 2011 Nichols was a member of the first ever judging panel for a new schools poetry competition named "Anthologise", spearheaded by Poet Laureate Carol Ann Duffy. School students aged 11–18 from around the UK were invited to create and submit their own anthologies of published poetry. The first ever winners of Anthologise were the sixth-form pupils of Monkton Combe School, Bath, with their anthology titled The Poetry of Earth is Never Dead.

Honours and recognition 

Nichols has been the recipient of several awards for her poetry, beginning with the Commonwealth Poetry Prize in 1983, for I is a Long Memoried Woman, and her work is on several GCSE syllabuses.

In 2021, Nichols was the recipient of the Queen's Gold Medal for Poetry, on the basis of her body of work, chosen by a committee chaired by Poet Laureate Simon Armitage.

Personal life 
She lives in Lewes, East Sussex, with her partner, the Guyanese poet John Agard.

Bibliography

I is a Long-Memoried Woman, London: Karnak House, 1983  to 1984
 The Fat Black Woman's Poems, London: Virago Press, 1984
 A Dangerous Knowing: Four Black Women Poets (Barbara Burford, Gabriela Pearse, Grace Nichols, Jackie Kay), London: Sheba, 1985
 Whole of a Morning Sky (novel), London: Virago Press, 1986
 Over the River, 1986
 Hurricane Hits England,  1987
 Come into my Tropical Garden (poems), 1988
 Lazy Thoughts of a Lazy Woman (poems), 1989
 Sunris (poems), London: Virago, 1996
 Startling the Flying Fish, 2006
 Picasso, I Want My Face Back, Bloodaxe Books, 2009
 I Have Crossed an Ocean: Selected Poems, Bloodaxe, 2010
 Island Man
 The Insomnia Poems, 2017
 Passport to Here and There, Bloodaxe, 2020

Awards
1983: Commonwealth Poetry Prize (for I is a Long Memoried Woman)
1986: Arts Council Writers' Award
1996: Guyana Poetry Prize (for Sunris)
2000: Cholmondeley Award
2007: Elected a Fellow of the Royal Society of Literature
2008: Guyana Poetry Award Never live unloved
2021: Queen’s Gold Medal for Poetry

References

External links 
 "Interview with Grace Nichols", The English Association.

Further reading
"Grace Nichols", "Writers and Their Work" Series, Sarah Lawson Welsh (Northcote Press & the British Council; 2007)

1950 births
Black British women writers
Living people
Guyanese poets
Fellows of the Royal Society of Literature
People from Georgetown, Guyana
Guyanese emigrants to England
Guyanese women novelists
Guyanese novelists
20th-century Guyanese poets
21st-century poets
20th-century Guyanese women writers
Guyanese short story writers
20th-century Guyanese writers
20th-century short story writers